White is an unincorporated community in King County, in the U.S. state of Washington.

History
A post office called White was established in 1890, and remained in operation until 1895. The community was named after William H. White, a state judge.

References

Unincorporated communities in King County, Washington
Unincorporated communities in Washington (state)